Darren Hughes is a Gaelic football player from County Monaghan, Ireland. He plays at senior level for the Monaghan county team.

In 2011, Hughes was part of the Ireland team that won the 2011 International Rules Series against Australia by 130 to 65.

Honours
 Ulster Senior Football Championship (2): 2013, 2015
 National Football League, Division 2 (1): 2014
 National Football League, Division 3 (1): 2013

References

External links
 GAA Info Profile

Year of birth missing (living people)
Living people
Irish international rules football players
Monaghan inter-county Gaelic footballers
Ulster inter-provincial Gaelic footballers